Éric Jourdan (29 May 1938 – 7 February 2015) was a French novelist and playwright.

Perhaps his most famous book is his first, Les Mauvais Anges (English: The Wicked Angels, also translated into English under the title Two), published in 1955 when Jourdan was 17. It was immediately a source of controversy for its frank and erotic depiction of a homosexual relationship between two adolescent boys (who were cousins). Despite being banned twice over the course of thirty years, it was critically acclaimed. A translation into English by Richard Howard soon followed, and was also well received.

After the reception of Les Mauvais Anges, Jourdan continued to write using pseudonyms. He moved often and lived a bohemian lifestyle, living in Savoie and Tyrol, Austria before becoming the adopted ward of French-American writer Julien Green, after which he lived primarily in Paris.

References

1938 births
2015 deaths
20th-century French novelists
21st-century French novelists
French gay writers
French LGBT novelists
French male novelists
20th-century French male writers
21st-century French male writers
20th-century pseudonymous writers
21st-century pseudonymous writers